Keely Nicole Hodgkinson (born 3 March 2002) is an English athlete specialising in the 800 metres. At the age of 19, she won the silver medal at the 2020 Tokyo Olympics, breaking the British record set by Kelly Holmes in 1995. She is the 2022 World Championships and 2022 Commonwealth Games silver medallist, 2022 European champion, and a two-time European indoor champion from 2021 and 2023, with her 2021 title secured as the youngest ever European women's indoor 800 m winner.

Both Hodgkinson's Tokyo result and her junior indoor mark are European U20 records, making her at 800 m the fourth-fastest and the second-fastest under-20 woman of all time respectively. In 2021, she became the Diamond League champion. In February 2022, she set a British 800 m indoor record (improved in 2023), placing her sixth on the respective world all-time list. She also holds world indoor best in the 600 metres.

At age 16, Hodgkinson became the 800 m European U18 champion, and won England's U20 title. A year later, she took bronze at the European U20 Championships. She was the first junior woman in history to break the two-minute barrier in the indoor event. Hodgkinson is a three-time British national champion.

Personal life
Keely Hodgkinson was raised in Atherton near Leigh and Wigan in Greater Manchester. She has three younger siblings. Her mother Rachel trained for a time with Leigh Harriers while her father Dean had run the London Marathon in the past.

She attended Fred Longworth High School in Tyldesley and Loughborough College. In 2020, she became a student of criminology at the Leeds Beckett University, and took a gap year in 2021.

Career

Early career

Hodgkinson joined Leigh Harriers at the age of nine, but initially swam with Howe Bridge Aces before devoting herself fully to running.

At age of 10, she competed in the British Schools Modern Biathlon Championships in London. She finished second in the 500 metres with a personal best of 1:34.28 and also swam 50 m with a new best as well for eighth place overall. Her father advised her to run, and she was inspired by British heptathlete Jessica Ennis-Hill winning a gold medal at the 2012 London Olympics.

The next year, in 2013, Keely had an unbeaten streak of 14 consecutive running events. In winning a one-mile cross country course she became the first Leigh Harriers girl to take the individual under-11 title in both the South East Lancashire League and the Red Rose League. About two weeks later, she ran her 16th undefeated race, winning 2 km course with the lead of 45 seconds. On the track, as a first-year U13, she became double Greater Manchester champion at the 800 and 1200 metres.

In 2014, the then 12-year-old won all her 13 track races (across 800–1500 metres events) as well as many cross country competitions. She took her third Greater Manchester title on a 2.75 km cross country course and later defended both her track titles, breaking championship records – the latter of which had stood since 1985. Her 1200 m best was bettered only in 2019, remaining, as of 2023, the third-fastest on the British U13 girl's all-time list.

In 2015, she had to limit training and starts due to a mastoidectomy surgery to remove a tumour on her ear (which has left her 95% deaf in this ear) followed by problems with knees.

Aged 14, the youngster finished third in the U15 800 m events at the ESAA English Schools' Championships and at the England Championships. Around that period Hodgkinson began to specialise at this distance while still running cross country. The next year, in 2017, running in the U17 800 m races, she came fourth at the ESAA Championships and took her first gold medal at the England Championships, setting a lifetime best of 2:06.85. She added the 1500 m UK School Games title.

Youth career
In June 2018, at 16, Hodgkinson became the England U20 800 m champion. The next month, she won a gold medal at the European U18 Championships held in Győr, Hungary, finishing in 2:04.84 and breaking the championship record in the process. In August, she added titles at the England under-17s and at the UK School Games with a competition record. In October, Wigan Borough Council named Hodgkinson Sports Achiever of the Year, selecting her for its Believe Talent Fund. Her season's and lifetime best was 2:04.26.

Her 2019 athletics year was affected by shin problems for most of the winter. Despite this, she placed second at the England under-20s and took bronze at the U20 Europeans held in Borås, Sweden, setting a new personal best of 2:03.40.

Junior career

2020
On 1 February, still only 17, Hodgkinson won 800 m event at the Vienna Indoor Track & Field competition in a European U20 record time of 2:01.16. She broke Kirsty Wade's long-standing 1981 British U20 record of 2:02.88, and Aníta Hinriksdóttir's European U20 mark set in 2015 by 0.4 seconds. The same month, she went on to take her first national title at the British Indoor Championships. Outdoors in August, she won two BMC gold standard races in Trafford with a new best in the first of them, and then improved it to 2:01.78 at the end of the month to finish second at a meeting in Gothenburg, Sweden. In what was her international outdoor debut at senior level, Hodgkinson lost only to the 2019 world silver medallist, Raevyn Rogers. In September, she also claimed the British outdoor title to become the youngest winner since 1974. She clocked even better lifetime best with 2:01.73, when ending her season in Rovereto (5th), Italy three days later.

2021: Tokyo Olympic silver medallist
2021 began with the first British women's world U20 record for 36 years. Hodgkinson returned and won in Vienna for the second consecutive year in 1:59.03 – her first result under 2 minutes, making her the first junior woman in history to break this mark in the indoor 800 m. She obliterated by exactly two seconds previous best set by Ethiopia's Meskerem Legesse in 2004. Her record stood for less than a month, however, before being improved by her chief rival and age-mate, USA's Athing Mu, who ran a time of 1:58.40.

On Hodgkinson's senior major championship debut, four days after her 19th birthday, she became the youngest British winner at the European Athletics Indoor Championships for more than half a century and the youngest ever women's 800 m European indoor champion after a tactical win over a quality field in Toruń, Poland. Only Marilyn Neufville has been a younger UK gold medallist when winning the 400 metres in 1970 at age 17, and Hodgkinson was younger than fellow Briton Jane Colebrook, who became the then-youngest European 800 m champion in 1977.

In May, Keely secured her first major international outdoor victory at the Golden Spike in Ostrava, posting for the first ever time sub-2 minute mark outdoors with 1:58.89 as she broke by almost a second long-standing UK junior record of Charlotte Moore. While not the fastest European U20 women's result, officially it was also the European junior record, beating Birte Bruhns' mark of 1:59.17 set in 1988. At the end of June, she defended her British title at the Nationals which doubled up as Olympic trials, securing a place on the plane to Tokyo, outsprinting experienced Scottish duo Jemma Reekie and Laura Muir on the final straight. A week later, she lowered her PB to 1:57.51 when finishing fourth at the Stockholm Diamond League meet, setting a British U23 record.

At the delayed 2020 Tokyo Games in August, Hodgkinson won the silver medal, taking almost two seconds off her previous personal best and almost six seconds off her pre-2021 best with a time of one minute 55.88 seconds, behind Athing Mu (1:55.21). She broke Kelly Holmes' 26-year-old British record of 1:56.21 and the 1978 European U20 best of 1:57.45. All top five and the seventh woman set their lifetime bests. For the first time in history three women from Britain competed in the Olympic final, with Jemma Reekie narrowly missing out on bronze and Alexandra Bell placing seventh.

In her first post-Olympic race and return to the Diamond circuit, the Briton came fifth in USA's Eugene, then second in Brussels, and ended the season with a 1:57.98 victory in the Zürich final in September to claim her first 800 m Diamond Trophy.

Until October she was not funded by UK Athletics as the organisation, possibly due to the COVID-19 pandemic, did not add anyone onto its World Class Performance Programme in 2020. She was backed by businessman Barrie Wells, who had previously helped fund 20 athletes to the 2012 London Summer Games; he matched her £15,000 a year Lottery funding allowing for warm-weather training in Florida. Hodgkinson is one of Wells Trust's athlete ambassadors.

Senior career

2022: World silver medallist

That year was very packed and demanding for still very young athlete, including World Indoor Championships in March and three major outdoor championships in just a one-month span in the summer.

On the heels of a successful 2021 season, Hodgkinson opened her athletics year on 19 February with the fastest indoor 800 m performance by a woman in 20 years of 1:57.20 at the Birmingham Indoor Grand Prix. It was the quickest mark since the precise day she was born, when the world record was set. She established the British record, all-comers' record (best performance on country's soil), the fastest ever mark by a teenager, and the sixth-fastest indoor mark all time. Heading to the World Indoors Belgrade 2022 in March Hodgkinson was a red-hot favourite. However, she had to withdraw from the competition after warm-up in Belgrade due to a quad injury.

The 20-year-old kickstarted her summer season on 21 May on the Diamond circuit, with a victory in her specialist event in Birmingham. She then continued competition in the Diamond Race, winning in Eugene behind the pond, Oslo, and coming home second behind Kenya's Mary Moraa in Stockholm.

It was a very tense battle for the line against Mu this time in the final 100 m at the World Championships in Eugene, Oregon in July. After one of the most thrilling finishes of the Worlds, Hodgkinson came only 0.08 s behind her to claim the silver medal with a season's best of 1:56.38, comfortably ahead of Moraa. Less than two weeks later at the Birmingham Commonwealth Games, she was unexpectedly defeated by fast-finishing Moraa earning also a silver, 1:57.40 to 1:57.07. The same August, she lived up to her status as a pre-race favourite and secured her first major senior outdoor championship title, winning convincingly her two-laps event at the European Championships Munich 2022.

Concluding this busy athletics year she struggled to maintain her form, and had to settle for fifth at the Zürich Diamond League final in September; the race was won by Moraa. However, Hodgkinson's Birmingham indoor mark made her the world leader for the season with a nearly 1.3-second advantage, while her timing from the World Championship final ranked second outdoors that year.

2023–present

2022 saw the emergence of new rival for Hodgkinson as Moraa, defeated by Briton in the most important event during World finals, entered Mu–Hodgkinson equation. Keely got her 2023 campaign off to strong start. On 28 January, her Bryggen Sports' home indoor track facility in Manchester organised for its local star the less frequently run race of 600 metres as part of World Indoor Tour bronze meet. She scorched to a world indoor best of 1:23.41, beating by 0.03 s Olga Kotlyarova's record set in 2004. She clashed indoors with Moraa in Toruń about two weeks later and then in Liévin, France, with Hodgkinson taking dominant victories, setting a meet record at the former (1:57.87). She triumphed also more than 2.50 s clear of the field at the World Indoor Tour Final in Birmingham, improving her own British indoor record by 0.02 s with a time of 1:57.18 and taking her first overall 800 m World Indoor Tour victory. The Briton rounded off her indoor campaign with a successful, overwhelming defense of her European title at Istanbul 2023. She dedicated the win to her first coach in athletics, Joe Galvin, who died a few days earlier.

Achievements
Information taken from World Athletics profile unless otherwise noted. Last updated on 5 March 2023.

Personal bests

International competitions

Circuit wins and titles
800 metres wins, other events specified in parenthesis.
 Diamond League champion:  2021
 2021: Zürich Weltklasse
 2022: Birmingham Diamond League, Eugene Prefontaine Classic, Oslo Bislett Games
 World Athletics Continental Tour
 2021: Ostrava Golden Spike
 World Athletics Indoor Tour 800 m overall winner: 2023
 2022: Birmingham Indoor Grand Prix (WL  )
 2023: Manchester World Indoor Tour (Bronze level, 600m), Toruń Copernicus Cup (WL MR), Liévin Meeting Hauts-de-France Pas-de-Calais (WL), Birmingham World Indoor Tour Final (WL MR)

National championships and competitions
Track results only. Hodgkinson competed also at the ECCA English Championships (2014, 2016, 2017, 2018) with best place being fifth on a 5 km course in 2018, and at the cross country ESAA Championships (2016, 2017, 2018) with best place being second on a 3.8 km course in 2018.

Key: ;

Progression
Key: 

1U18 ranking, 2U20 ranking
 World rank from World Athletics' Season Top Lists

Honours and awards
2018
 British Athletics Supporters Club: Young Female Athlete of the Year
2021
 British Athletics Writers' Association: Cliff Temple Award for British Female Athlete of the Year
 British Athletics Supporters Club: Athlete of the Year
 Athletics Weekly: British Rising Star and British Female Athlete of the Year

Notes

References

External links

Videos
 Women's 800m final 🏃‍♀️ | Tokyo Replays – by International Olympic Committee via YouTube (15:29)
 Keely Hodgkinson runs 1:57.20 to smash British record | World Indoor Tour Birmingham 2022 – by World Athletics via YouTube (2:47)
 Behind the scenes of Keely Hodgkinson's world indoor 600m record – Short movie by Athletics Weekly via YouTube (10:41)

Living people
2002 births
Sportspeople from Wigan
Alumni of Loughborough College
Alumni of Leeds Beckett University
British female middle-distance runners
English female middle-distance runners
British Athletics Championships winners
European Athletics Indoor Championships winners
Athletes (track and field) at the 2020 Summer Olympics
Medalists at the 2020 Summer Olympics
Olympic silver medalists in athletics (track and field)
Olympic silver medallists for Great Britain
English Olympic medallists
Olympic athletes of Great Britain
Diamond League winners
World Athletics Championships medalists
Commonwealth Games silver medallists for England
Commonwealth Games medallists in athletics
Athletes (track and field) at the 2022 Commonwealth Games
European Athletics Championships winners
Medallists at the 2022 Commonwealth Games